Carnaby railway station was a minor railway station serving the village of Carnaby on the Yorkshire Coast Line from  to Hull, England. The station probably opened on 7 October 1846 when the York and North Midland Railway opened the line between Hull and Bridlington.

The station was host to a camping coach from 1935 to 1939.

The station closed on 5 January 1970.

The western end of the station was to be the junction of the Bridlington and North Frodingham Light Railway. The act of parliament for this line was granted in 1898 under the Light Railways Act 1896. The line was to have been standard gauge and worked by steam locomotives throughout. The line was never built.

As of 2018, the two platforms are still visible and can be seen from the main road next to the station, however overgrown.

References

Further reading

Disused railway stations in the East Riding of Yorkshire
Railway stations in Great Britain opened in 1846
Railway stations in Great Britain closed in 1970
Stations on the Hull to Scarborough line
1846 establishments in England
Former York and North Midland Railway stations
Beeching closures in England
George Townsend Andrews railway stations